The Alabama Public Service Commission, commonly called the PSC, was established by an act of the Alabama Legislature in 1915 to primarily replace the State Railroad Commission.  The PSC's responsibility was expanded in 1920 to include regulating and setting rates that utility companies charge their customers for electricity.  The legislature expanded the PSC's responsibilities in later years to include those companies that provide gas, water, and communications, as well as transportation common carriers such as trucking and air carriers.  The PSC effectively determines the rate of profits that most of these companies are allowed to earn.  However, some of its traditional responsibilities have passed to the federal government with the passage of the Federal Aviation Act of 1994 and the Federal Communications Act of 1996.

Election of commissioners

The Alabama Public Service Commission is composed of three elected members, a President and two associate commissioners.  They run statewide in partisan elections and each serves a 4-year term.  When vacancies occur they are filled by appointment by the Governor of Alabama.  There is no limit to the number of terms to which they may be elected.  The President of the Commission is elected during the cycle of U.S. Presidential elections and the two associate commissioners are elected during United States midterm elections

Current commissioners

President: 
Twinkle Andress Cavanaugh  (R)
Associate Commissioners:
  Place 1 - Jeremy H. Oden (R)
  Place 2 - Chris "Chip" Beeker, Jr. (R)

Recent Associate Commissioner Twinkle Andress Cavanaugh was elected to the Presidency of the PSC on November 6, 2012, when she defeated the one term incumbent Democrat Lucy Baxley.  Baxley had been the only remaining statewide elected Democrat still in office in Alabama and was first elected in 2008, with a margin of about 10,000 votes which translated into 50.3% of the vote over Republican Twinkle Cavanaugh.  Commissioner Baxley previously served as Alabama State Treasurer and Lieutenant Governor before losing a race for governor to Bob Riley in 2006.  Cavanaugh was elected to her third term as President of the PSC on November 3, 2020 with over 60% of the vote.

Commissioner Cavanaugh, in defeating Baxley in 2012 received just over 55% of the ballots cast and had a margin of about 100,000 vote.  She had previously served as both Executive Director and later was elected as the first female Chairman of the Alabama Republican Party.  She was initially elected to the Commission on November 2, 2010, in her third campaign for statewide office.  She defeated long-time commissioner Jan Cook with 56% of the vote and a margin of more than 186,000 votes.  The seat that Cavanaugh vacated for the PSC Presidency was filled for the remainder of her term by an appointee by Governor Robert J. Bentley. In July 2014, Cavanaugh called on the people of Alabama to pray for God's intervention to prevent the EPA's proposed regulations for coal-power plants from taking effect, stating that the EPA was attempting to take "what God's given a state" from the people of Alabama.

Commissioner Chip Beeker was elected in 2014 when he defeated incumbent Republican Terry Dunn in the GOP primary runoff on July 15, 2014. Beeker was unopposed in the general election that November and was re-elected again on November 6, 2018.

Commissioner Jeremy H. Oden was appointed to a vacancy on the PSC by Governor Robert Bentley at the beginning of December 2012 to the seat vacated by Cavanaugh upon her election to the PSC Presidency.  Oden had served in the Alabama House of Representatives from 1998 until his appointment.  Commissioner Oden was nominated on June 3, 2014 for a full four-year term. Oden was unopposed in the general election.  He was re-elected again on November 6, 2018 following a very narrow primary victory in June, 2018.

History and prior commissioners

Sometimes, the commission served as a stepping stone to run for higher offices in the state, although not always successfully.  Commissioners B. B. Comer and Gordon Persons moved from the PSC to the office of governor.  Long-time Commissioner C.C. "Jack" Owen unsuccessfully ran for governor from the PSC.  In 2018, Commission President Twinkle Cavanaugh ran an unsuccessful campaign for the Republican nomination for Lt. Governor losing to Will Ainsworth who went on to win the office.

Commissioner Jim Folsom Jr. was elected Lieutenant Governor in 1986 and was re-elected in 1990.  He was elevated to the governor's office in 1993 upon the felony conviction of Gov. Guy Hunt.  As an incumbent, he was defeated in the gubernatorial election in 1994 by Republican Fob James.  Folsom stayed out of elective politics for 12 years.  Folsom returned to public office with his 2006 election to the office of Lieutenant Governor.  He was again defeated for re-election in 2010 when he lost the Lieutenant Governor post to Republican Kay Ivey. Folsom is the son and namesake of two-time Alabama governor James E. "Big Jim" Folsom, famous for being a progressive on civil rights when it was unpopular to be so.

Commissioner Jim Zeigler served a single term on the PSC.  He was elected State Auditor in November, 2014 and on January 19, 2015 returned to statewide office.  He is a vocal opponent of what he terms "wasteful government spending" and a critic of Governor Robert Bentley.  In 1946, Jimmy Hitchcock parlayed his earlier fame as an Auburn University football player and major league baseball player to a seat on the Commission and served there until his death in 1959.

One of the most infamous and colorful politicians in Alabama was Commissioner Eugene "Bull" Connor, a Democrat who had earlier served as police commissioner in Birmingham.  He made national news when he ordered the police to use dogs and fire hoses on civil rights demonstrators during the Civil Rights protests in the 1960s.  He lost a race for governor in 1970 in the Democrat primary to eventual nominee, George Wallace.

Commissioner Ed Pepper and his wife were killed in the worst fire in Alabama history in 1966. The Dale's Penthouse restaurant fire in Montgomery took 26 lives. He was the nephew of well-known U.S. Senator and Congressman Claude Pepper of Florida, an Alabama native.  The long-serving Claude Pepper became a national spokesman for senior citizens.

Two commissioners were convicted of felony offenses while serving and were automatically removed from office—Juanita McDaniel and Kenneth "Bozo" Hammond.  Hammond later was elected Mayor of his native Valley Head, Alabama.

Sibyl Pool became the first of six women to serve on the PSC when she took office in January, 1955.  Three of those women have been President of the PSC.

Hammond, Lynn Greer, and Pete Matthews all had previously served in the Alabama Legislature as Democrats and a fourth, Jeremy Oden, was a Republican state legislator at the time of his appointment.  Greer later lost a race for Congress in north Alabama's Tennessee Valley district.  Greer was then three times elected to the state legislature again as recently as 2014 as a Republican.

See also
Government of Alabama
Public Utilities Commission

Notes

External links

Public Service Commission
Public utilities commissions of the United States
Public Service Commission
Government agencies established in 1915
1915 establishments in Alabama